Eupatorium lindleyanum is a herbaceous perennial plant in the family Asteraceae native from China, Japan, Korea and Siberia. There are at least two varieties including:
 Eupatorium lindleyanum var. lindleyanum
 Eupatorium lindleyanum var. eglandulosum

Description
Eupatorium lindleyanum is a herbaceous perennial growing from 30 to 150 cm tall from a short rhizome.

References

Flora of Korea
lindleyanum